Nesbitt Reservoir is located on Pennsylvania Route 502 in Spring Brook Township, Lackawanna County, Pennsylvania.  The reservoir is managed and protected by the Pennsylvania American Water Company (PAWC).  It provides a fresh water supply to approximately 75,000 area residents and is situated on Spring Brook, the second-largest tributary to the Lackawanna River.  Spring Brook begins near Yostville, Pennsylvania and flows  to its confluence with the Lackawanna River in Moosic, Pennsylvania.  The watershed of  Spring Brook watershed has nine named tributaries of its own, counting subtributaries.

In 2012 Pennsylvania American Water completed improvements costing $27.4 million to the dam which contains the 1.3 billion-gallon reservoir.

Whitewater rafting is done from the reservoir to Moosic. It is a medium difficult level for paddling for those who are not ready for the roaring rapids but not quite a beginner.

It is no longer accessible to the public since the reservoir was purchased from PAWC.  Before that time, there was a nature trail that included sights of creeks, the stream, falls, deer and other small animals of nature.

References

External links
http://www.lrca.org/pages/northpocono/pages/springbrookfactsheet.htm

Reservoirs in Pennsylvania
Protected areas of Lackawanna County, Pennsylvania
Bodies of water of Lackawanna County, Pennsylvania